The 2017 Dudley Hewitt Cup was the 46th Central Canadian Jr A Ice Hockey Championship for the Canadian Junior Hockey League. The Winner of the 2018 Dudley Hewitt Cup represented the central region in the 2017 Royal Bank Cup in Cobourg, ON.

Teams
Trenton Golden Hawks (Host)
Regular Season: 42-9-2-1 (1st OJHL East Division)
Playoffs: Defeated Newmarket Hurricanes 4-2, Defeated Stouffville Spirit 4-0, Defeated Cobourg Cougars 4-0, Defeated by Georgetown Raiders 4-3.

Georgetown Raiders (OJHL Champions)
Regular Season: 45-5-2-2 (1st OJHL West Division)
Playoffs: Defeated Buffalo Jr. Sabres 4-1, Defeated Toronto Jr. Canadiens 4-0, Defeated Oakville Blades 4-2, Defeated Trenton Golden Hawks 4-3 to win league championship.

Powassan Voodoos (NOJHL Champions)
Regular Season: 46-7-2-1 (1st in NOJHL East Division)
Playoffs: Defeated Kirkland Lake Gold Miners 4-0, Defeated Timmins Rock 4-0, Defeated Blind River Beavers 4-0 to win the league.

Dryden Ice Dogs (SIJHL Champions)
Regular Season: 45-7-4-0 (1st in SIJHL)
Playoffs: Defeated Fort France Lakers 4-0, Defeated English River Miners 4-0 to win league.

Tournament

Round Robin
x = Clinched championship round berth; y = Clinched first overall

Tie Breaker: Head-to-Head, then 3-way +/-.

Results

Semifinals and final

References
https://pointstreak.com/prostats/scoreboard.html?leagueid=255&seasonid=16851
http://pointstreaksites.com/view/ojhl
https://nojhl.com/
https://sijhlhockey.com/

2016–17 in Canadian ice hockey